Karrat Fjord  is a fjord in Avannaata municipality in western Greenland.

Geography 
Karrat Fjord has its mouth in the Nordost Bay of the Baffin Bay. The head of the fjord is formed by a number of tributaries, including the Rink Glacier, Ingia Glacier and Umiamako Glacier fjords, as well as the Ukkusissat Fjord.

The fjord heads to the southwest, with the islands of Qeqertarsuaq Island (Karrat Fjord), Illorsuit Island and Upernivik Island near its mouth.

See also
List of fjords of Greenland

References 

Fjords of Greenland